Jeremy Brooks Rosen (born October 16, 1971) is an American lawyer from California and is a former nominee to be a United States district judge of the United States District Court for the Central District of California.

Education 

Rosen received his Bachelor of Arts, magna cum laude, from Cornell University, and was inducted into Phi Beta Kappa. He earned his Juris Doctor and Master of Laws, magna cum laude, from Duke University School of Law, where he served on the Duke Law Journal and was inducted into the Order of the Coif.

Legal career 

Upon graduation from law school, he served as a law clerk to Judge William Matthew Byrne Jr. of the United States District Court for the Central District of California. He later clerked for Judge Ferdinand Fernandez of the United States Court of Appeals for the Ninth Circuit.

He currently serves as a partner in the Los Angeles, California, office of Horvitz & Levy LLP. His practice focuses on appellate litigation, primarily in the United States Court of Appeals for the Ninth Circuit, California Supreme Court, and California Courts of Appeal. He specializes in First Amendment cases, with expertise in both the Speech and Religion Clauses, and is a California Bar Certified Appellate Specialist.

Expired nomination to district court 

On October 10, 2018, President Trump announced his intent to nominate Rosen to serve as a United States District Judge for the United States District Court for the Central District of California. On November 13, 2018, his nomination was sent to the Senate. President Trump nominated Rosen to the seat vacated by Judge Margaret M. Morrow, who took senior status on October 29, 2015.

On January 3, 2019, his nomination was returned to the President under Rule XXXI, Paragraph 6 of the United States Senate. On January 30, 2019, President Trump announced his intent to renominate Rosen to the district court. On February 6, 2019, his nomination was sent to the Senate. On January 3, 2020, his nomination was once again returned to the President under Rule XXXI, Paragraph 6 of the United States Senate. On February 13, 2020, his renomination was sent to the Senate. On January 3, 2021, his nomination was returned to the President under Rule XXXI, Paragraph 6 of the United States Senate.

Memberships 

He has been a member of the Federalist Society since 1999.

References 

1971 births
Living people
20th-century American lawyers
21st-century American lawyers
California lawyers
California Republicans
Cornell University alumni
Duke University School of Law alumni
Federalist Society members
People from Hanover, New Hampshire